Chaudhary Lajja Ram was an Indian politician and member of the Indian National Congress. Lajja Ram was a member of the Himachal Pradesh Legislative Assembly from the Doon constituency in Solan district.

References 

People from Solan district
Indian National Congress politicians
Janata Dal politicians
1933 births
2015 deaths
21st-century Indian politicians
Speakers of the Himachal Pradesh Legislative Assembly
Himachal Pradesh MLAs 1990–1992
Himachal Pradesh MLAs 1993–1998
Himachal Pradesh MLAs 1998–2003
Himachal Pradesh MLAs 2003–2007